Pršovce is a village in the municipality of Tearce, North Macedonia.

Name
The name appears in medieval records as Prushefc, from the Latin loan into Albanian pirus-prush and the Slavic suffix ovci/e.

Demographics
As of the 2021 census, Pršovce had 1,923 residents with the following ethnic composition:
Albanians 1,871
Persons for whom data are taken from administrative sources 37
Macedonians 11
Others 4

According to the 2002 census, the village had a total of 2,516 inhabitants. Ethnic groups in the village include:

Albanians 2478
Macedonians 1
Romani 6
Serbs 1 
Others 29

References

External links

Villages in Tearce Municipality
Albanian communities in North Macedonia